Warlocks and Warriors is an anthology of fantasy short stories in the sword and sorcery subgenre, edited by American writer L. Sprague de Camp. It was first published in hardcover by Putnam in 1970, and in paperback by Berkley Books in 1971. It was the fourth such anthology assembled by de Camp, following his earlier Swords and Sorcery (1963), The Spell of Seven (1965), and The Fantastic Swordsmen (1967).

Summary
The book collects ten sword and sorcery tales by various authors, with an overall introduction by de Camp. As with the previous volume in the anthology series, The Fantastic Swordsmen, most of the stories are accompanied by maps illustrating their settings.

Contents
"Introduction" (L. Sprague de Camp)
"Turutal" (Ray Capella)
"The Gods of Niom Parma" (Lin Carter)
"The Hills of the Dead" (Robert E. Howard)
"Thunder in the Dawn" (Henry Kuttner)
"Thieves' House" (Fritz Leiber)
"Black God's Kiss" (C. L. Moore)
"Chu-Bu and Sheemish" (Lord Dunsany)
"The Master of the Crabs" (Clark Ashton Smith)
"The Valley of the Spiders" (H. G. Wells)
"The Bells of Shoredan" (Roger Zelazny)

Notes

External links
 " Forgotten Stories of Fantastic Sword-fighters: L. Sprague de Camp’s (ed.) Warlocks and Warriors" - a book review by Andy Beau

1970 anthologies
Fantasy anthologies
L. Sprague de Camp anthologies
G. P. Putnam's Sons books